Maurice Hunt (born December 16, 1943) is a former American football coach.  He served as the head football coach at Central State University (1977–1978), Kentucky State University (1992–1994), Morehouse College (1979–1989, 1995–1996), and Lane College (1997), compiling a career college football record of 66–125–4.

Coaching career
Hunt was the 24th head football coach at Kentucky State University in Frankfort, Kentucky and he held that position for three seasons, from 1992 until 1994.  His career coaching record at Kentucky State was 7–25–1.

Head coaching record

References

1943 births
Living people
Central State Marauders football coaches
Grinnell Pioneers football coaches
Kentucky State Thorobreds football coaches
Lane Dragons football coaches
Morehouse Maroon Tigers football coaches